Amaravati – Anantapur Expressway is a Proposed Greenfield expressway of length 598.78 km in the Indian state of Andhra Pradesh. It was mainly Proposed to Connect the Cities of Rayalaseema to the other part of the state with an Expressway. This Proposed Expressway serves as a major Expressway along with the National Highway 16. It also has two feeder expressways connected to Kurnool and Kadapa with a length of 123.7 km and 104.05 km. It was primarily planned to go through the capital of the state, Amaravati but is now changed to connect at the junction of National Highway 16 at Chilakaluripet. It is being built by the National Highways Authority of India under Phase–VII of National Highways Development Project. This  Expressway  is  Expected  to  be Built  by  December, 2023 .

The project 
The cost of project is expected to be . It would cut travel time between Amaravathi and Anantapur by 120 minutes. The expressway will be six lanes wide with service roads. It was proposed that this road will be designed for a speed of 120 kmph with straight alignments, avoiding habitations and locations of archaeological and religious importance. Tunnels and viaducts are proposed to be constructed to avoid hilly terrains and valley sections. The expressway will carry all public amenities viz. under passes, service roads, provision for green belt, rest houses, petrol pumps, service centres, restaurants and four agricultural mandis for milk, potatoes, grains, and fruits.

Project Stretch 
The Proposed Expressway Connects the Guntur With Ananthapur. The Spinal Corridor takes Off from NH-44 Near Maruru in Ananthapuramu District and Ends at Pedaparimi near Sakhamuru, thereby Crossing the Vijayawada IRR Near Tadikonda and ORR Near Velavarthipadu. Few Fragments of Proposed Expressway Pass Through Nallamala Forest Area. The Expressway Traverses Across The Districts of Ananthapuram, Kurnool, Kadapa, Prakasam and Guntur. 6-lane road Starts from Yadavalli which forms a Single Straight Stretch to the State Capital. The Expressway is Proposed To be Designed as High-Speed Corridor by Making it completely Access-Controlled.

The Government of Andhra Pradesh has Proposed to Withdraw The Above Said Previous Plan and Connect this Expressway at Chilakaluripet junction of National Highway 16 to which the Central government agreed thereby saving Rs 3,500 crore and also 741 hectares of land from acquiring. This also reduces the distance of about 47 km of road length. 

The Expressway is Actually Divided into 18 legs. But after Changing its North End To Chilakaluripeta, The Project Has Remained with 14 legs.

The feeder Roads of  Kadapa and Kurnool are Leg 19, 20,21 

Main Line of Expressway

• Leg 01: Stretch from Maruru to Kandakur (Anantapur Dist.)

• Leg 02: Stretch from Kandakur to Chamaluru (Anantapur Dist.)

• Leg 03: Stretch from Chamaluru to Hussainpuram (Anantapur Dist.)

• Leg 04: Stretch from Hussainpuram to Boyala Tadipatri (Anantapur & Kurnool Dist.)

• Leg 05: Stretch from Boyala Tadipatri to Allur (Kurnool Dist.)

• Leg 06: Stretch from Allur to Nallagatla (Kurnool Dist.)

• Leg 07: Stretch from Nallagatla to Chinna Kambaloor (Kurnool & Prakasam Dist.)

• Leg 08: Stretch from Chinna Kambaloor to Yadavalli (Prakasam Dist.)

• Leg 09: Stretch from Yadavalli to Nekunambadu (Prakasam Dist.)

• Leg 10: Stretch from Nekunambadu to Kethagudipi (Prakasam Dist.)

• Leg 11: Stretch from Kethagudipi to Gudipadu (Prakasam Dist.)

• Leg 12: Stretch from Gudipadu to Kunduru (West) (Prakasam Dist.)

• Leg 13: Stretch from Kunduru (West) to Komalapadu (Prakasam Dist.)

• Leg 14: Stretch from Komalapadu to Chilakaluripeta (Prakasam & Guntur Dist.) 

The Feeder Road of Kadapa 

• Leg 19: Stretch from Bhoomayapalli to Kalasapadu (YSR Dist.) 

• Leg 20: Stretch from Kalasapadu to Yadavalli (Prakasam & Guntur Dist.) 

The Feeder Road of Kurnool

• Leg 21: Stretch from Pedda Kambalur to Ayalurmitta (Kurnool Dist.) 

Note

Leg 15, 16, 17, 18 were cancelled and North end was restricted to NH-16 near Chilakaluripet.

Route 
It will connect to Chilakaluripet from Anantapur with Two Feeder Expressways Kurnool Feeder and Kadapa Feeder intersecting with it. It Will have a Total Length of 368.50 km Service Roads. It will Have 33 major Bridges, Four Railway Over Bridges, 14 Interchanges, and 10 km length of tunnel.

References 

Roads in Amaravati
Roads in Anantapur district
Expressways in Andhra Pradesh
Proposed expressways in India